HMS Magnet was the former French privateer San Joseph or San Josepho, built in 1807, that the British captured in 1809. The Royal Navy took her into service as HMS Magnet. She disappeared, presumed to have foundered with all hands, while sailing to Halifax, Nova Scotia, in August or September 1812.

Privateer
San Joseph was a brig-corvette commissioned in Saint-Malo in November 1807 under François-Auguste Blanchard. She made two cruises between 1807 and February 1809.

Capture
On 12 February 1809, Captain Thomas James Maling, sighted the French privateer San Joseph in the Channel. Undaunted discovered San Josephe at dawn, taking her after a chase lasting four hours, and brought her into Spithead the next day. The privateer, which was only four days out from St. Malo, was provisioned for two months and pierced for 18 guns, but mounted only 14, and had a crew of 96 men.

Career
The Admiralty named San Joseph HMS Magnet,  just having been lost. She underwent fitting at Portsmouth between 14 February and 10 July. She was commissioned under the command of Commander John Smith, who was preparing her for the ill-fated Walcheren Campaign. She served in the campaign and was among the many vessels that shared in the prize money for having served in the Schelde between 30 July and 16 August.

After the Campaign, Magnet apparently saw much boat service at the "entrance of the German Rivers."

That same day Desiree and Magnet captured Harmonia. Then on 3 March Magnet recaptured Jean.

Magnet captured the Frouw Heintze on 5 October.

Commander Ferdinand Moore Maurice replaced Smith in 1811. On 14 April 1812, Magnet sailed for South America.

Fate
Magnet parted company with the squadron in a tremendous gale about two weeks out of Halifax, and never arrived. She is believed to have foundered with all hands.

Plans 
David Lyon has published the plans of Magnet in his book The Sailing Navy List.

Notes

Citations

References
 
 

1800s ships
Privateer ships of France
Sloops of the Royal Navy
Maritime incidents in 1812
Missing ships
Warships lost with all hands
Captured ships